The following list includes notable people who were born or have lived in Harvey, Illinois. For a similar list organized alphabetically by last name, see the category page People from Harvey, Illinois.

Arts and culture 

 Nina Chanel Abney (1982– ), painter
 Ivan Albright (1897–1983), magic realist, painter, and artist
 The Dells (1952- ), Rock and Roll Hall of Fame singing group started at Thornton High School in Harvey, IL <https://en.wikipedia.org/wiki/The_Dells>
 Paris Barclay (1956– ), two-time Emmy-winning television director and producer
 Michael Boatman (1964–), actor and writer
 Ed Cassidy (1923–2012), rock and jazz drummer, member of Spirit
 Adam Davenport (1984– ), film director and screenwriter
 Tom Dreesen (1942– ), stand-up comedian
 Nelsan Ellis (1978–2017), actor and playwright
 Lupe Fiasco (1982– ), rapper
 Edward Page Gaston (1868–1956), journalist and temperance activist
 Lucy Page Gaston (1860–1924), anti-tobacco activist
 LaRoyce Hawkins (1988– ), actor, Chicago P.D.
 Bill Hayes (1925– ), actor and singer
 Kevin Huizenga (1977– ), cartoonist
 J. B. Hutto (1926–1983), musician in Blues Hall of Fame
 Syleena Johnson (1976– ), Grammy-nominated singer-songwriter
 Sharon Lewis, (1952– ), blues vocalist
 VaShawn Mitchell (1974– ), gospel singer
 KeKe Palmer, (1993– ), Emmy awarded actress and musician
 Dandrell Scott (1984– ), rapper and voiceover actor
 Willie Taylor (1981– ), singer, member of DAY26
 Newton Thornburg (1929–2011), novelist and screenwriter
 Nick Vincent (1958– ), musician and composer
 Mark Weiser (1952–1999), computer scientist, drummer of Severe Tire Damage
 Steven Whitehurst, (1967– ), author
 Jaboukie Young-White, (1994– ), stand-up comedian and writer

Politics
 Flora Ciarlo (1932– ), member of the Illinois House of Representatives; born in Harvey
 Frederic R. DeYoung (1875–1934), served as a judge on the Illinois Supreme Court, Superior Court of Cook County, and the original Circuit Court of Cook County, and served as a member of the Illinois House of Representatives

Religion
 Louis Tylka (1970- ), born in Harvey, Bishop of the Roman Catholic Diocese of Peoria, Illinois (2022- ), previously Coadjutor Bishop of Peoria (2020-2022)

Sports

Baseball 

 Lou Boudreau (1917–2001), Hall of Fame shortstop for the Cleveland Indians and Boston Red Sox; manager and broadcaster
 Jeff Duncan (1978– ), outfielder for the New York Mets
 John Ely (1986– ), pitcher for the Los Angeles Dodgers
 Justin Huisman (1979– ), pitcher for the Kansas City Royals
 Garrett Jones (1981– ), player for the Minnesota Twins and Pittsburgh Pirates
 Eric Knott (1974– ), pitcher for the Arizona Diamondbacks and Montreal Expos
 Don Robertson (1930–2014), right fielder for the Chicago Cubs
 Pete Stanicek (1963– ), second baseman and left fielder for the Baltimore Orioles
 Dizzy Trout (1915–1972), pitcher for 1945 World Series champion Detroit Tigers; died in Harvey

Basketball 

 Jim Ard (1948– ), basketball player for Boston Celtics; attended Thornton High in Harvey
 Lloyd Batts (1951– ), basketball player for University of Cincinnati; attended Thornton High in Harvey
 Leon Clark (1943- ), basketball player; attended Thornton High in Harvey
 Eddy Curry (1982– ), center for four NBA teams
 Kevin Duckworth (1964–2008), center for five NBA teams
 Melvin Ely (1978– ), center and power forward for five NBA teams; NBA champion (2007); born in Harvey
 Mustapha Farrakhan, Jr. (1988- ), basketball player; grandson of Nation of Islam leader Louis Farrakhan
 Reggie Hamilton (1989– ), basketball player
 Ariel McDonald (1972– ), basketball player; 2000 Israeli Basketball Premier League MVP; former Slovenian national player

Football 

 Ted Albrecht (1954– ), lineman for Chicago Bears
 Ed Beinor (1917–1991), tackle for 1942 NFL champion Washington Redskins
 Antwaan Randle El (1979– ), wide receiver and punt returner for Super Bowl XL champion Pittsburgh Steelers, Washington Redskins, Pittsburgh Steelers, and New England Patriots; attended Thornton High in Harvey
 Barry Gardner (1976– ), linebacker for Philadelphia Eagles, Cleveland Browns, New York Jets, and New England Patriots
 Richard Johnson (1963– ), All American cornerback at University of Wisconsin–Madison and with Houston Oilers
 Jim Smith (1955– ), wide receiver for Pittsburgh Steelers and Los Angeles Raiders; two-time Super Bowl champion
 Tai Streets (1977– ), wide receiver for San Francisco 49ers; attended Thornton High in Harvey

Other 
 Dana Schoenfield (1953- ), swimmer, 1972 Olympic silver medalist; born in Harvey

References

Harvey, Illinois
Harvey